The 1903 Arizona football team was an American football team that represented the University of Arizona as an independent during the 1903 college football season. In their first season under head coach Orin A. Kates, the team played only two games, both against the Tucson Indian School.  The university team won both games. The team captain was Leo Rosenberg.

With key players from the 1902 team lost to graduation, injury, or illness, interest in football apparently waned at the university in the fall of 1903. On October 25, 1903, The Arizona Daily Star noted the failure of students to organize a football team up to that point and urged the students to "ginger up" and organize a team. A team was ultimately organized and was known as the "preps" or the "University Prep. football team".

Schedule

References

Arizona
Arizona Wildcats football seasons
College football undefeated seasons
Arizona football